Ornella Ferrara (born 17 April 1968) is an Italian long-distance runner who specialized in the marathon race. She represented her country twice at the Summer Olympics (1996 and 2000) and was the bronze medalist in the marathon at the 1995 World Championships in Athletics. She has won marathon races in her home country, including the Rome City Marathon, Carpi Marathon and Venice Marathon.

Biography
She narrowly missed out on a medal at the 1994 European Athletics Championships, coming fourth. After that she won the Venice Marathon, followed by the Ferrara Marathon. A run at the 1995 World Championships in Athletics brought her the marathon bronze medal. She represented Italy in the marathon at the Summer Olympics in both 1996 and 2000, but did not reach the top twelve on either occasion.

In 1997 she came fifth at the World Championships Marathon, claimed the title at the Italian Marathon and closed her year with a third place at the New York City Marathon. She did not compete again until 2000, where she returned to the distance with a seventh-place finish at the Boston Marathon. Ferrara returned to full competition in 2001, reach the podium at the San Diego Marathon and Milan Marathon then running for Italy at the 2001 World Championships in Athletics (where she came 14th).

A third place at the Berlin Marathon highlighted her 2003. She won the 2004 Rome City Marathon with a personal best time of 2:27:49 hours, and was runner-up at the Palermo Marathon later that year. Her next marathon win came at the Brescia Marathon in 2008.

She won the inaugural edition of the Monaco Run in March 2011. A ninth-place finish at the Turin Marathon later that year saw her come second in the Italian championship race behind Martina Celi.

Achievements

Personal bests
Half marathon - 1:11:46 hrs (2000)
Marathon - 2:27:49 hrs (2004)

National titles
Italian Long Distance Mountain Running Championships
Long distance mountain running: 2011

References

External links
 
Onella Ferrara at Marathoninfo

1968 births
Living people
Italian female long-distance runners
Italian female marathon runners
Athletes (track and field) at the 1996 Summer Olympics
Athletes (track and field) at the 2000 Summer Olympics
Olympic athletes of Italy
Sportspeople from the Province of Monza e Brianza
World Athletics Championships medalists
World Athletics Championships athletes for Italy
Italian female mountain runners
20th-century Italian women
21st-century Italian women